Ready II Fly is the fourth studio album by American a capella group Naturally 7, which was released on September 30, 2006 through Virgin Germany Records. The album peaked at number 67 in France. Ready II Fly debuted at number 14 on the Australian ARIA Charts as of June 13, 2008. This follows a successful tour of Australia as the supporting act of Michael Bublé.

Track listing 

Naturally 7 albums
2006 albums